"Phantasia Forever" is a song written and recorded by Belgian acid house musician Praga Khan. Different mixes of the song were featured on A Spoonful of Miracle and Conquers Your Love.

Track listing
 "Phantasia Forever (Mental Radio Mix)" - 4:48	
 "Phantasia Forever (A Capella: The Fairytale)" - 4:19	
 "Phantasia Forever (MNO Mix)" - 5:38	
 "Phantasia Forever (InstruMental Radio Mix)" - 4:48	
 "Phantasia Forever (Joey Beltram Mix)" - 5:38	
 "Phantasia Forever (Interstellar Mix)" - 3:39	
 "Phantasia Forever (GTO Mix)" - 5:23	
 "Phantasia Forever (MNO Astro Mix)" - 5:38

References

1993 singles
1993 songs
Praga Khan songs